Archbishop Joseph Tawil (December 25, 1913 – February 17, 1999) was the Melkite Greek Catholic eparch for the United States, teacher and theologian. He is remembered for his participation in the Second Vatican Council, expanding the Melkite Church in the United States, and articulating the unique role of the Eastern Catholic Churches in his 1970 pastoral letter The Courage To Be Ourselves.

Early life 

Joseph Elias Tawil was born in Damascus, Syria, the son of Elias and Malakie (Salman) Tawil. One of nine children in the family, he was raised in an observant Melkite family; his maternal uncles included Paul Salman, the Archbishop of Petra and all Jordan, and Archimandrite Clement Salman. He studied for the priesthood under the White Fathers in St. Anne's Seminary in Jerusalem. He was ordained as priest on July 20, 1936 and assigned to the Patriarchal College (Al Madrassah Al Batryakiyah) in Cairo, Egypt. For seven years he was a teacher and later dean of the institution. In 1943 he became president/headmaster of the college. He was raised to the dignity of archimandrite by Patriarch Maximos IV Sayegh in 1952 and appointed Patriarchal Vicar of Alexandria in 1954 with continued residence in Cairo as head of the college. Tawil continued to lead the Patriarchal College in Cairo until his appointment as Patriarchal Vicar of Damascus on August 29, 1959.

Episcopate

Damascus and United States 

Tawil was consecrated bishop in Damascus on January 1, 1960. While in this position he attended the Second Vatican Council where, as a representative of the Melkite Church, he worked with Patriarch Maximos IV to further understanding and cooperation between the Church of Rome and the Eastern Orthodox Church. In November 1967 Patriarch Maximos IV was succeeded after his death by Archbishop Tawil's friend and predecessor in the Cairo Patriarchal College, Archbishop George Selim Hakim, a native Egyptian who took the name Maximos V. Archbishop Hakim had been the first Archbishop of Nazareth and all Galilee and had been the guide for Pope Paul VI on his pilgrimage to the Holy Land at the beginning of his reign.

On October 30, 1969, Archbishop Tawil was appointed Apostolic Exarch for the United States by Pope Paul VI, and was installed on March 15, 1970. He succeeded Bishop Justin Najmy, the first Melkite bishop in the United States. Bishop Najmy had died only two years after his installation, and thus the major task of welding an efficient diocese out of the existing parishes scattered over the country fell to Archbishop Tawil.

Upon arriving in the United States Tawil was fluent in Arabic and French and proficient in Greek and Latin but did not speak English. He quickly learned English and published some of his most influential writings in the language of his new homeland.

The Courage To Be Ourselves 

One of Tawil's first actions was to write the pastoral letter "The Courage to be Ourselves" to strengthen his flock, many of whom were relatively newcomers in this country and surrounded by the far more numerous Latin Catholics. The document, delivered as a Christmas 1970 pastoral letter, reminds Eastern Catholics of their rich traditions and how the Catholic Church benefits from diversity. In it he stated:

Development of the Eparchy of Newton 

Tawil founded the diocesan publication "Sophia" and in 1971 established a diaconate training program, the first in an Eastern Catholic diocese in the United States. He also established a Diocesan Pastoral Council. Later he inaugurated a Diocesan Communications Office, the National Association of Melkite Youth, and a full-time Office of Educational Services.

On June 28, 1976 Tawil was raised to archbishop. He was installed as eparch of Newton on February 14, 1977. During his tenure as eparch, Tawil founded eight new parishes and five missions. He ordained 26 new priests and 23 deacons. He also played a significant role in the founding a convent for women religious in Danbury, Connecticut.

Upon reaching retirement age, Archbishop Tawil assumed emeritus status on December 12, 1989, but remained active in church affairs despite the onset of Parkinson's disease. He was succeeded by Bishop Ignatius Ghattas as Eparch of Newton. Tawil died at Newton-Wellesley Hospital in Massachusetts on February 17, 1999.

Books and other publications

Tawil published several books in both Arabic and English. They include:

See also
Melkite Greek Catholic Church
Eparchy of Newton
Maximos IV Sayegh

References

Notes

External links
 Melkite Greek Catholic Church Biography of Joseph Tawil
 The Courage To Be Ourselves 
 Introduction to the Liturgy of the Divine Office, by Archbishop Joseph Tawil
 Melkite Greek Catholic Patriarchate of Antioch, Alexandria and Jerusalem
 L'Église Melkite/The Melkite Church.
 Melkite Catholic Web Ring.
 Official Website of the Melkite Church in the US.
 Extensive history of the Melkite Church
 

American Melkite Greek Catholic bishops
American Eastern Catholics
White Fathers priests
Syrian Melkite Greek Catholics
Syrian bishops
Participants in the Second Vatican Council
Syrian emigrants to the United States
1999 deaths
1913 births
20th-century Eastern Catholic bishops
Melkite Greek Catholic bishops
20th-century American clergy